Erioptera septemtrionis is a species of limoniid crane fly in the family Limoniidae.
The word septemtrionis means "Northern" in Latin

References

Limoniidae
Articles created by Qbugbot
Insects described in 1859